Lunde Church may refer to:

Lunde Church (Agder), a church in Sirdal municipality in Agder county, Norway
Lunde Church (Innlandet), a church in Nordre Land municipality in Innlandet county, Norway
Lunde Church (Telemark), a church in Nome municipality in Vestfold og Telemark county, Norway

See also
Lund Church (disambiguation)